Hopewell is a settlement in Saint Andrew Parish, Jamaica.

References

Populated places in Saint Andrew Parish, Jamaica